Emmanuel Kojo Quayeson (13 April 1987- 23 October 2016) also known as Vybrant Faya  was a Ghanaian dancehall artiste known for his hit song Mampi.

Early life 
He was born in Tema to Mr. Samuel Quayson and Miss Theresah Ackon but grew up in Ashiaman. He also has five other siblings, he comes from the Central Region

Career 
Vybrant Fire started recording in 2008 where he was known as Skelloh. Mr. Logic who became his manager in 2011 rebranded  him and he changed his name from Skelloh to Vybrant Fire.

Death 
Vybrant Fire was killed by a motor rider on the Tema Motorway.

Achievement 
He is known for his major hit song Mampi which got everyone on their feet. He was nominated for Artiste of The Year and Best Reggae/Dancehall Song of The Year at the 2015 VGMA.

References 

2016 deaths
Dancehall musicians
Reggae fusion artists
Musicians from Accra
Road incident deaths in Ghana
1987 births